Carlford Division, Suffolk is an electoral division of Suffolk which returns one county councillor to Suffolk County Council.

Robin Vickery, the Conservative County Councillor resigned on 8 June 2020 following over 600 complaints were made concerning racist posts he had shared on Facebook. He resigned before a Council investigation could be put in place, also resigning as a councillor for Castle Hill Ward, Ipswich and from the Conservative Party. Suffolk County Council stated that in light of the COVID-19 pandemic, the seat would not be contested until May 2021.

Parishes 
The following parishes are in the Carlford Division.

 Boulge
 Brandeston
 Bredfield
 Burgh
 Charsfield
 Clopton
 Cretingham
 Culpho
 Dallinghoo
 Debach
 Earl Soham
 Easton
 Great Bealings
 Grundisburgh
 Hasketon
 Hoo
 Kettleburgh
 Letheringham
 Little Bealings
 Monewden
 Otley
 Playford
 Swilland
 Tuddenham St Martin
 Westerfield
 Witnesham

References

 
Electoral Divisions of Suffolk
East Suffolk (district)